"Tell Me Goodbye" is a song released by the South Korean boy band Big Bang. It's the group's fourth Japanese single and second single from the album Big Bang 2 (2011). It was released on June 9, 2010. "Tell Me Goodbye" is song in Japanese, with the exception of a few English lines. A Korean version of the song, "Hands Up", was added on the group's fourth Korean extended play Tonight (2011).

Track listing

Charts

Weekly charts

Sales and certifications

Release history

References

External links 
Big Bang Official Website
Big Bang Japan Official Website
Big Bang by Universal Music Japan

BigBang (South Korean band) songs
2010 singles
YG Entertainment singles
Universal Music Japan singles
Japanese-language songs
Songs with lyrics by Shoko Fujibayashi
2010 songs
Songs written by Jimmy Thörnfeldt
Songs written by Mohombi